John James Chilton (16 July 1932 – 25 February 2016) was a British jazz trumpeter and writer. During the 1960s, he also worked with pop bands, including The Swinging Blue Jeans and The Escorts. He won a Grammy Award for Best Album Notes in 1983.

Biography
Chilton was born in London on 16 July 1932, to working-class parents (his father was a musical hall comedian) and was evacuated to Northamptonshire, where he began playing the cornet at the age of 12. He switched to trumpet at 17 and after doing national service in the RAF (1950–1952) he formed his own jazz band, playing at Butlins.

He worked in Bruce Turner's Jump Band from 1958 to 1963. A film of their exploits called Living Jazz (1961) was made by director Jack Gold. Chilton later appeared in Alex Welsh's Big Band.

He later worked with Wally Fawkes, also known as the cartoonist "Trog", and in January 1974 formed John Chilton's Feetwarmers, who began accompanying British jazz singer and writer George Melly. Together they made records and toured the world for nearly 30 years.

Chilton won a Grammy Award for Best Album Notes on Bunny Berigan (1983) and was nominated in the same category in 2000 for The Complete Lester Young Studio Sessions on Verve. In the same year he won the British Jazz Award for Writer of the Year. He wrote Who's Who of Jazz.

Bibliography
Louis: The Louis Armstrong Story (with Max Jones) (1971), ; (1988), 
Ride Red Ride – the Life of Henry 'Red' Allen (2000), 
Roy Eldridge, Little Jazz Giant (2002), 
McKinney's Music – A bio-discography of McKinney's Cotton Pickers (1978), 
A Jazz Nursery – The Story of Jenkins Orphanage Band (1980), 
Teach Yourself Jazz (1979), 
Stomp Off, Let's Go: The Story of Bob Crosby's Bob Cats (1983), 
Who's Who of Jazz (1970, 1972, 1978, 1985, 1989) ISBN see:
Let the Good Times Roll: The Story of Louis Jordan (1997), 
Billie's Blues – A survey of Billie Holiday's Career (1975), 
The Song of the Hawk – The Life and Recordings of Coleman Hawkins (1990), 
Sidney Bechet – the Wizard of Jazz (1988), 
Who's Who of British Jazz (1997), ; (2004),

Autobiography

Discography
Nuts (1972)
Son of Nuts (1973)
It's George (1974)
Making Whoopee (1982)
Best of Live (1995)
Anything Goes (1996)
Goodtime George
The Ultimate Melly, including guest Van Morrison (2006)

References

1932 births
2016 deaths
Musicians from London
English jazz trumpeters
Male trumpeters
Grammy Award winners
British male jazz musicians